The 1889 University of Utah football team was an American football team that represented the University of Utah as an independent during the 1899 college football season. Head coach Charles Gatehouse led the team to a 2–1 record.

Schedule

References

University of Utah
Utah Utes football seasons
University of Utah football